Abbotsford station is a railway station in Abbotsford, British Columbia, Canada, located along CN railway tracks.

The station is served by Via Rail's The Canadian as a flag stop (48 hours advance notice required).  The station is only served by westbound trains towards Vancouver. Eastbound trains call at Mission Harbour railway station along the CPR tracks, on the other side of the Fraser River. This split in service between Vancouver and Ashcroft is due to CN and CPR utilizing directional running through the Thompson- and Fraser Canyon.

References 

Buildings and structures in Abbotsford, British Columbia
Transport in Abbotsford, British Columbia
Via Rail stations in British Columbia